The AeroSpace and Defence Industries Association of Europe (ASD) is a trade association for the aerospace, defense and security industries in Europe. According to the organization, it represents over 3,000 companies in 17 countries.

History 
The organization was formed in 2004 through the merger of the Association of European Space Industry (Eurospace), European Association of Aerospace Industries (AECMA) and European Defence Industries Group (EDIG).

Activities 
The organization serves as a lobbying group and policy advocate for the industry within the European Union establishment, in particular the European Defence Agency, the European Union Aviation Safety Agency, as well as the European Union Agency for the Space Programme.

The organization is responsible for maintaining the ASD-STE100 Simplified Technical English (STE) standards for aerospace technical documentation.

References 

Organizations based in Europe
2004 establishments in Europe
European trade associations
Aviation organizations